The College Hill Historic District is a historic district in Scottsboro, Alabama.  The neighborhood was the first subdivision to be platted in Scottsboro.  The area takes its name from the Scott Male and Female Academy, which was built in 1878. The site has been occupied by schools since; the present building was constructed in the 1930s and currently houses the administration offices of the Scottsboro Board of Education.  The district contains 14 houses, 10 of which were built between 1890 and 1929, three in the 1930s, and one in the 1970s.  The earlier houses are primarily Vernacular styles, although the later construction includes Bungalow and English Cottage-style houses popular at the time.  The district was listed on the Alabama Register of Landmarks and Heritage in 1982 and the National Register of Historic Places in 1983.

References

National Register of Historic Places in Jackson County, Alabama
Historic districts in Jackson County, Alabama
Properties on the Alabama Register of Landmarks and Heritage
Historic districts on the National Register of Historic Places in Alabama